Women in Italy refers to females who are from (or reside in) Italy. The legal and social status of Italian women has undergone rapid transformations and changes during the past decades. This includes family laws, the enactment of anti-discrimination measures, and reforms to the penal code (in particular with regard to crimes of violence against women).

History

Women in Pre-modern Italy
During the Middle ages, Italian women were considered to have very few social powers and resources, although some women inherited ruling positions from their fathers (such in the case of Matilde of Canossa). Educated women could find opportunities of leadership only in religious convents (such as Clare of Assisi and Catherine of Siena).

The Renaissance (15th–16th centuries) challenged conventional customs from the Medieval period. Women were still confined to the roles of "monaca, moglie, serva, cortigiana" ("nun, wife, servant, courtesan"). However, literacy spread among upper-class women in Italy and a growing number of them stepped out into the secular intellectual circles. Venetian-born Christine de Pizan wrote The City of Ladies in 1404, and in it she described women's gender as having no innate inferiority to men's, although being born to serve the other sex. Some women were able to gain an education on their own, or received tutoring from their father or husband.

Lucrezia Tornabuoni in Florence; Veronica Gambara at Correggio; Veronica Franco and Moderata Fonte in Venice; and Vittoria Colonna in Rome were among the renowned women intellectuals of the time. Powerful women rulers of the Italian Renaissance, such as Isabella d'Este, Catherine de' Medici, or Lucrezia Borgia, combined political skill with cultural interests and patronage. Unlike her peers, Isabella di Morra (an important poet of the time) was kept a virtual prisoner in her own castle and her tragic life makes her a symbol of female oppression.

By the late 16th and early 17th centuries, Italian women intellectuals were embraced by contemporary culture as learned daughters, wives, mothers, and equal partners in their household. Among them were composers Francesca Caccini and Leonora Baroni, and painter Artemisia Gentileschi. Outside the family setting, Italian women continued to find opportunities in the convent, and now increasingly also as singers in the theatre (Anna Renzi—described as the first diva in the history of opera—and Barbara Strozzi are two examples). In 1678, Elena Cornaro Piscopia was the first woman in Italy to receive an academical degree, in philosophy, from the University of Padua.

In the 18th-century, the Enlightenment offered for the first time to Italian women (such as Laura Bassi, Cristina Roccati, Anna Morandi Manzolini, and Maria Gaetana Agnesi) the possibility to engage in the fields of science and mathematics. Italian sopranos and prime donne  continued to be famous all around Europe, such as Vittoria Tesi, Caterina Gabrielli, Lucrezia Aguiari, and Faustina Bordoni. Other notable women of the period include painter Rosalba Carriera and composer Maria Margherita Grimani.

Women of the Risorgimento
The Napoleonic Age and the Italian Risorgimento offered for the first time to Italian women the opportunity to be politically engaged. In 1799 in Naples, poet Eleonora Fonseca Pimentel was executed as one of the protagonists of the short-lived Parthenopean Republic. In the early 19th century, some of the most influential salons where Italian patriots, revolutionaries, and intellectuals were meeting were run by women, such as Bianca Milesi Mojon, Clara Maffei, Cristina Trivulzio di Belgiojoso, and Antonietta De Pace. Some women even distinguished themselves in the battlefield, such as Anita Garibaldi (the wife of Giuseppe Garibaldi), Rosalia Montmasson (the only woman to have joined the Expedition of the Thousand), Giuseppina Vadalà, who along with her sister Paolina led an anti-Bourbon revolt in Messina in 1848, and Giuseppa Bolognara Calcagno, who fought as a soldier in Garibaldi's liberation of Sicily.

The Kingdom of Italy (1861–1925)

Between 1861 and 1925, women were not permitted to vote in the new Italian state. In 1864, Anna Maria Mozzoni triggered a widespread women's movement in Italy, through the publication of Woman and her social relationships on the occasion of the revision of the Italian Civil Code (La donna e i suoi rapporti sociali in occasione della revisione del codice italiano). In 1868, Alaide Gualberta Beccari began publishing the journal "Women" in Padua.

A growing percentage of young women were now employed in factories, but were excluded from political life and were particularly exploited. Under the influence of socialist leaders, such as Anna Kuliscioff, women became active in the constitution of the first Labour Unions. In 1902, the first law to protect the labour of women and children was approved and limited women to twelve hours of work per day.

By the 1880s, women were making inroads into higher education. In 1877, Ernestina Puritz Manasse-Paper was the first woman to receive a university degree in modern Italy, in medicine, and in 1907 Rina Monti became the first female department chair and full professor in an Italian University.

The most famous women of the time were actresses Eleonora Duse, Lyda Borelli, and Francesca Bertini; writers Matilde Serao, Sibilla Aleramo, Carolina Invernizio, and Grazia Deledda (who won the 1926 Nobel Prize in Literature); sopranos Luisa Tetrazzini and Lina Cavalieri; and educator Maria Montessori.

Maria Montessori was the most amazing woman at this time as she was the first Italian physician, and began Montessori education which is still used today. She was part of Italy's change to further give women rights, and she was an influence to educators in Italy and around the globe.

Under the Fascist regime (1925–1945)

Women's rights suffered a setback under the Fascist government of Benito Mussolini, with fascist ideology dictating procreation as a woman's duty. A series of laws tried to force Italian women back to their roles of wives and mothers. Any political activity by women was harshly repressed; in 1930 antifascist activist Camilla Ravera was sentenced to 15 years in prison.  The only woman to whom some political prominence was given during the early Fascist period was Margherita Sarfatti; she was Benito Mussolini's biographer in 1925 as well as one of his mistresses.

The racial laws of 1938 inflicted another blow to women's empowerment in Italy, since a large percentage of the few Italian women to have academic positions  were of Jewish descent, from Anna Foà to Enrica Calabresi.

More than 50,000 women, mostly in their twenties, took part in the Italian resistance movement during the Italian Civil War, when Italy was under German occupation (1939-1945). Their mass participation increased the involvement of women in Italian political life.

The Italian Republic (1945–present)

After World War II, women were given the right to vote in 1946 Italian institutional referendum. The new Italian Constitution of 1948 affirmed that women had equal rights. It was not however until the 1970s that women in Italy scored some major achievements with the introduction of laws regulating divorce (1970), abortion (1978), and the approval in 1975 of the new family code.

Famous women of the period include politicians Nilde Iotti, Tina Anselmi, and Emma Bonino; actresses Anna Magnani, Sofia Loren, and Gina Lollobrigida; soprano Renata Tebaldi; ballet dancer Carla Fracci; costume designer Milena Canonero; sportwomen Sara Simeoni, Deborah Compagnoni, Valentina Vezzali, and Federica Pellegrini; writers Natalia Ginzburg, Elsa Morante, Alda Merini, and Oriana Fallaci; architect Gae Aulenti; scientist and 1986 Nobel Prize winner Rita Levi-Montalcini; astrophysicist Margherita Hack; astronaut Samantha Cristoforetti; pharmacologist Elena Cattaneo; and CERN Director-General Fabiola Gianotti.

In 2022, Giorgia Meloni became the first female Prime Minister of Italy.

Issues in present time
Today, women have the same legal rights as men in Italy, and have mainly the same job, business, and education opportunities.

Abortion

The maternal mortality rate in Italy is 4 deaths/100,000 live births (as of 2010), one of the lowest in the world. The HIV/AIDS rate is 0.3% of adults (aged 15–49)—estimates of 2009.

Abortion laws were liberalized in 1978: abortion is usually legal during the first trimester of pregnancy, while at later stages of pregnancy it is permitted only for medical reasons, such as problems with the health of the mother or fetal defects. However, in practice, there have been difficulties in obtaining an abortion, due to the rising number of doctors and nurses who refuse to perform an abortion based on moral/religious opposition, which they are legally allowed to do. It has been reported that 67% of unintended pregnancies in Italy have managed to successfully result in abortions. The abortion ratio in 2018 was 173.8 per 1,000 live births.

Marriage and family
Divorce in Italy was legalized in 1970. Obtaining a divorce in Italy is still a lengthy and complicated process, requiring a period of legal separation before it can be granted, although the period of separation has been reduced in 2015. Adultery was decriminalized in 1969, after the Constitutional Court of Italy struck down the law as unconstitutional, because it discriminated against women. In 1975, Law No. 151/1975 provided for gender equality within marriage, abolishing the legal dominance of the husband.

Unmarried cohabitation in Italy and births outside of marriage are not as common as in many other Western countries, but in recent years they have increased. In 2017, 30.9% of all births were outside of marriage, but there are significant differences by regions, with unmarried births being more common in the North than in the South. Italy has a low total fertility rate, with 1.32 children born/woman (in 2017), which is below the replacement rate of 2.1. Of women born in 1968, 20% stayed childless. In the EU, only Greece, Spain, Cyprus, Poland, and Portugal have a lower total fertility rate than Italy.

Female education

Women in Italy tend to have highly favorable results, and mainly excel in secondary and tertiary education. Ever since the Italian economic miracle, the literacy rate of women as well as university enrolment has gone up dramatically in Italy. The literacy rate of women is only slightly lower than that of men (as of 2011, the literacy rate was
98.7% female and 99.2% male). Sixty percent of Italian university graduates are female, and women are excellently represented in all academic subjects, including mathematics, information technology, and other technological areas which are usually occupied by males.

Work

Female standards at work are generally of a high quality and professional, but are not as good as in education. The probability of a woman getting employed is mainly related to her qualifications, and 80% of women who graduate from university go on to seek jobs.  Women in Italy face a number of challenges. Although gender roles are not as strict as they have been in the past, sexual and domestic abuse is still quite prevalent in Italy. On average, women do 3.7 hours more housework than men. Men make up the majority of the parliament but more than a third of the seats are held by women (around 36%, a higher rate than countries like Netherlands and Germany, as well as the average EU rate), which makes Italy the eighth country the EU by percentage of women in the national parliament. Additionally, women in Italy are not adequately represented in the workforce, as Italy has one of the lowest rates of employment for women of the countries within the European Union. Women's employment rate (for ages 15–64) is 47.8% (in 2015), compared to 66.5% for men. Many women are still frequently expected to stay at home and care for the house and children, as opposed to earning a salary and becoming a breadwinner, and few senior managerial positions are held by women. Furthermore, there are unequal standards and expectations for the few women who actually make it into a professional setting. Women cannot be fired because of pregnancy, by law, as on the 26th of March 2001 the Legislative Decree number 151 was released, to protect pregnant women at work. An infamous practice in Italy used to be that of "white resignation" (dimissione in bianco), whereby female employees are asked as condition for their employment or promotion to sign undated resignation papers, which were kept by the employer who added a date on them when the woman was pregnant so that she "resigns" at that date. Yet this practice, which is illegal, did not specifically affect women, as it used to be done for both male and female employers. Italian lawmakers are working to further protect and support women as they break gender stereotypes and join the workforce, but complete cultural change is slow.
Nevertheless, the proportion of women in the workforce has increased in recent years: according to World Bank, in 1990 women made up 36.3% of the labour force, while by 2016 they made up 42.1%.

Pay
Women holding white collar, high level, or office jobs tend to get paid the same as men.

Culture and society
Today, there is a growing acceptance of gender equality, and people (especially in the North) tend to be far more liberal towards women getting jobs, going to university, and doing stereotypically male things. However, in some parts of society, women are still stereotyped as being simply housewives and mothers, also reflected in the fact of a higher-than-EU average female unemployment.

Ideas about the appropriate social behaviour of women have traditionally had a very strong impact on the state institutions, and it has long been held that a woman's 'honour' is more important than her well-being. Until the 1970s, rape victims were often expected and forced to marry their rapist. In 1965, Franca Viola, a 17-year-old girl from Sicily, created a sensation when she refused to marry the man who kidnapped and raped her. In refusing this "rehabilitating marriage" to the perpetrator, she went against the traditional social norms of the time which dictated such a solution. Until 1981, the Criminal Code itself supported this practice, by exonerating the rapist who married his victim. The Franca Viola incident was made into a movie called La moglie più bella.

In 2000 female toplessness was officially legalized (in a nonsexual context) in all public beaches and swimming pools throughout Italy (unless otherwise specified by region, province or municipality by-laws) on 20 March 2000, when the Supreme Court of Cassation (through sentence No. 3557) determined that the exposure of the nude female breast, after several decades, was considered a "commonly accepted behavior", and therefore, "entered into the social costume".

In more recent times the media, particularly TV shows, have been accused of promoting sexist stereotypes. In 2017, one talk-show of a state-owned broadcaster was cancelled after accusations that it promoted discriminatory views of women.

Violence against women
In 2020, statistics showed that 8 out of 10 female victims murders were murdered by a current or previous partner. A third of women were exposed to violence. From 2000 to 2012, 2200 women were killed and 75% of those were murdered by a former or current partner. This represented about one murder every two days. A 2012 United Nations report noted that 90% of women who were raped or abused in Italy did not report the crime to police.

In recent years, Italy has taken steps to address violence against women and domestic violence, including creating Law No. 38 of 23 April 2009. Italy has also ratified the Convention on preventing and combating violence against women and domestic violence.

Regardless these data, Italy has got a rate of murders of women equal to 0.43 (much lower than the rate of the murders of men), placing Italy at the fifth place by lowest rate of murders of women in the EU. Moreover, the trend has been decreasing since 1992.

Until the 1970s, in some regions rape victims were often expected and forced to marry their rapist. In 1965, Franca Viola, a 17-year-old girl from Sicily, created a sensation when she refused to marry the man who kidnapped and raped her. In refusing this "rehabilitating marriage" to the perpetrator, she went against the traditional social norms of the time which dictated such a solution. In 1976 in the Supreme Court of Italy ruled that "the spouse who compels the other spouse to carnal knowledge by violence or threats commits the crime of carnal violence" [meaning rape] ("commette il delitto di violenza carnale il coniuge che costringa con violenza o minaccia l’altro coniuge a congiunzione carnale"). As well, in 1981, Italy repealed Article 544.

Traditionally, as in other Mediterranean-European areas, the concept of family honour was very important in Italy. Indeed, until 1981, the Criminal Code provided for mitigating circumstances for so-called honour killings.
Traditionally, honour crimes used to be more prevalent in Southern Italy.

Gallery

Bibliography
 Aa.Vv. Il Novecento delle Italiane. Una storia ancora da raccontare. Roma: Editori Riuniti, 2001.
 Addis Saba, Marina. Partigiane. Le donne della resistenza. Milano: Mursia, 1998.
 Bellomo, Manlio. La condizione giuridica della donna in Italia: vicende antiche e moderne. Torino: Eri, 1970.
 Boneschi, Marta. Di testa loro. Dieci italiane che hanno fatto il Novecento. Milano: Monadori, 2002.
 Bruni, Emanuela, Patrizia Foglia, Marina Messina (a cura di). La donna in Italia 1848-1914. Unite per unire. Cinisello Balsamo, Milano: Silvana, 2011.
 Craveri, Benedetta. Amanti e regine. Il potere delle donne. Milano: Adelphi, 2005.
 Dal Pozzo, Giuliana. Le donne nella storia d'Italia. Torino: Teti, 1969.
 De Giorgio, Michela. Le italiane dall'Unità a oggi: modelli cultuali e comportamenti sociali. Roma-Bari: Laterza, 1992.
 Drago, Antonietta. Donne e amori del Risorgimento. Milano: Palazzi, 1960.
 Grazia, Victoria de. How Fascism Ruled Women: Italy, 1922-1945. Berkeley: University of California Press, 1993.
 Matthews-Grieco, Sara F. (a cura di). Monaca, moglie, serva, cortigiana: vita e immagine delle donne tra Rinascimento e Controriforma. Firenze: Morgana, 2001.
 Migliucci, Debora. Breve storia delle conquiste femminili nel lavoro e nella società italiana. Milano: Camera del lavoro metropolitana, 2007.
 Roccella, Eugenia, e Lucetta Scaraffa. Italiane (3 voll.). Roma: Dipartimento per le pari opportunita', 2003.
 Rossi-Doria, Anna (a cura di). A che punto è la storia delle donne in Italia. Roma: Viella, 2003.
 Willson, Perry. Women in Twentieth-Century Italy. Palgrave Macmillan, 2009.

See also
 Women in Ancient Rome

References

External links
 Valentina Piattelli, History of Women Emancipation in Italy
 Women in Italian universities
 Women in the Italian Resistance during WW2
 Italian women who made history
 Women in Italy, from the Unification to the present

 
Italy